Robert Suiter Woodard (born January 10, 1985) is an American baseball coach and former pitcher. He is the head baseball coach at the University of North Carolina at Charlotte. Woodard played college baseball at the University of North Carolina at Chapel Hill from 2004 to 2007 for coach Mike Fox and in Minor League Baseball (MiLB) for three seasons from 2007 to 2009.

Woodard was born in Winston-Salem, North Carolina. He attended Myers Park High School in Charlotte, North Carolina. After graduation from high school, he decided to attend University of North Carolina at Chapel Hill to play baseball. After his junior season, he was selected by the St. Louis Cardinals in the 2006 Major League Baseball draft's 46th round. He returned to North Carolina for his senior season where he was drafted in the twentieth round of the 2007 Major League Baseball draft by the San Diego Padres.

In 2019, Woodard was named the head coach of the Charlotte 49ers baseball program.

Amateur career
Woodard attended Myers Park High School in Charlotte, North Carolina, where he played for the school's baseball teams where he pitched and played shortstop. As a senior, the Team One South Showcase named Woodard a top 10 prospect. He also played on the Area Code National Team in the Japan Goodwill Series.

The all-time winningest pitcher in program history at UNC, Woodard posted a career record of 34–5 over four seasons as a Tar Heel. He was a three-time All-ACC performer and the 2006-07 recipient of the Patterson Medal, North Carolina's highest athletic honor. From 2004 to 2007, the Tar Heels won 195 games and advanced to back-to-back College World Series Finals in 2006 and 2007. In addition to the aforementioned career record of 34–5, Woodard finished his college career with a perfect 22–0 record at UNC's Boshamer Stadium. He also left Carolina ranking among the top 10 in Atlantic Coast Conference history in victories and innings pitched.

Head coaching record

See also
 List of current NCAA Division I baseball coaches

References

External links

Charlotte 49ers profile

1985 births
Living people
North Carolina Tar Heels baseball players
Eugene Emeralds players
Portland Beavers players
Fort Wayne Wizards players
Lake Elsinore Storm players
North Carolina Tar Heels baseball coaches
UNC Wilmington Seahawks baseball coaches
Virginia Tech Hokies baseball coaches
Charlotte 49ers baseball coaches
Baseball players from Winston-Salem, North Carolina
Baseball coaches from North Carolina